The rack is a torture device consisting of a rectangular, usually wooden frame, slightly raised from the ground, with a roller at one or both ends. The victim's ankles are fastened to one roller and the wrists are chained to the other. As the interrogation progresses, a handle and ratchet mechanism attached to the top roller are used to very gradually retract the chains, slowly increasing the strain on the prisoner's shoulders, hips, knees, and elbows and causing excruciating pain. By means of pulleys and levers, this roller could be rotated on its own axis, thus straining the ropes until the sufferer's joints were dislocated and eventually separated. Additionally, if muscle fibres are stretched excessively, they lose their ability to contract, rendering them ineffective.

One gruesome aspect of being stretched too far on the rack is the loud popping noises made by snapping cartilage, ligaments or bones. Another method for putting pressure upon prisoners was to force them to watch someone else being subjected to the rack. Confining the prisoner on the rack enabled further tortures to be simultaneously applied, typically including burning the flanks with hot torches or candles or using "pincers made with specially roughened grips to tear out the nails of the fingers and toes" or sliding thin slivers of red-hot coal between pairs of adjacent toes. Usually, the victim's shoulders and hips would be separated and their elbows, knees, wrists, and ankles would be dislocated.

Uses

Early use
The rack was first used in antiquity and it is unclear exactly from which civilization it originated, though some of the earliest examples are from Greece. The Greeks may have first used the rack as a means of torturing slaves and non-citizens, and later in special cases, as in 356 BC, when it was applied to gain a confession from an arsonist who was later executed for burning down the Temple of Artemis at Ephesus, one of the Seven Wonders of the Ancient World. Arrian's Anabasis of Alexander states that Alexander the Great had the pages who conspired to assassinate him, along with their mentor, his court historian Callisthenes, tortured on the rack in 328 BC.

According to Tacitus, the rack was used in a vain attempt to extract the names of the conspirators to assassinate Emperor Nero in the Pisonian conspiracy from the freedwoman Epicharis in 65 A.D. The next day, after refusing to talk, she was dragged back to the rack on a chair (all of her limbs were dislocated, so she could not stand), but strangled herself on a loop of cord on the back of the chair on the way. The rack, in Roman sources, was referred to with the name equuleus; the word fidicula, more commonly the name of a small lyre or stringed instrument, was used to describe a similar torture device, although its exact design has been lost.

The rack was also used on early Christians, such as St. Vincent (304 A.D.), and mentioned by the Church Fathers Tertullian and St. Jerome (420 A.D.).

Britain
Its first appearance in England is said to have been due to John Holland, 2nd Duke of Exeter, the constable of the Tower in 1447, and was thus popularly known as "the Duke of Exeter's daughter".

The Protestant martyr Anne Askew, daughter of Sir William Askew, Knight of Lincolnshire, was tortured on the rack before her execution in 1546 (age 25). She was well known for studying the Bible and memorizing verses; she remained apparently true to her beliefs even up to her execution. She was so damaged by the torture on the rack that she had to be carried on a chair to her burning at the stake. The accusations against her were from: (1) the Bishop's Chancellor, who claimed that women were not allowed to speak the Scriptures, and (2) the Bishop of Winchester, because she would not profess that the sacraments were the literal flesh, blood and bone of Christ; this despite the fact that the English Reformation had already begun a decade earlier.

The Catholic martyr Nicholas Owen, a noted builder of priest holes, died under torture on the rack in the Tower of London in 1606. Guy Fawkes is also thought to have been put to the rack, since a royal warrant authorising his torture survives. The warrant states that "lesser tortures" should be applied to him at first, but if he remained recalcitrant he could be racked.

In 1615 a clergyman called Edmond Peacham, accused of high treason, was racked.

In 1628 the question of its legality was raised in connection with a proposal in the Privy Council to rack John Felton, the assassin of George Villiers, the 1st Duke of Buckingham. The judges resisted this, unanimously declaring its use to be contrary to the laws of England. The previous year Charles I had authorised the Irish Courts to rack a Catholic priest; this seems to have been the last time the rack was used in Ireland.

In 1679 Miles Prance, a silversmith who was being questioned about the murder of the respected magistrate Sir Edmund Berry Godfrey, was threatened with the rack.

Russia

In Russia up to the 18th century the rack (дыба, dyba) was a gallows-like device for suspending the victims (strappado). The suspended victims were whipped with a knout and sometimes burned with torches.

Other punitive positioning devices

The term rack is also used, occasionally, for a number of simpler constructions that merely facilitate corporal punishment, after which it may be named specifically, e.g., caning rack, as in a given jurisdiction it was often the custom to administer any given punishment in a specific position, for which the device (with or without fitting shackling and/or padding) would be chosen or specially made.

Several devices similar in principle to the rack have been used through the ages. One of these was the Wooden Horse, a device used to torture prisoners during the Roman Empire by stretching them on top of a tall wooden frame until the shoulders were dislocated followed by a violent drop into a hanging position and beating. In another variant used primarily in ancient times, the victim's feet were affixed to the ground and his/her hands were chained to a wheel. When the wheel was turned, the person was stretched in a manner similar to the rack. The Austrian ladder was basically a more vertically oriented rack. As part of the torture, victims would usually be burned under the arms with candles.

See also
Procrustes
Strappado
Breaking on the wheel

References

Sources

Monestier, M. (1994) Peines de mort. Paris, France: Le Cherche Midi Éditeur.
Crocker, Harry W.; Triumph: The Power and Glory of the Catholic Church - A 2,000 Year History

Ancient instruments of torture
Medieval instruments of torture
Modern instruments of torture
European instruments of torture